João Pedro Silverio Lourenço (born 15 July 2005) is a Brazilian footballer who plays as a midfielder for Fluminense.

Club career
João Lourenço started his career with Fluminense at the age of ten, joining in 2015. He signed his first professional contract with the club in August 2021.

Career statistics

Club

References

2005 births
Living people
Brazilian footballers
Association football midfielders
Fluminense FC players